The Vätteryd grave field (Swedish: Vätteryds gravfält), also known as Vätterydshed, is an Iron Age grave field in Hässleholm Municipality in  Scania, Sweden. The site is located in a heathfield between the localities of Tjörnarp and Sösdala.
The grave field consists of 183 menhirs, 15 stone ships - the largest 25 m long and 8 m wide - and 2 circles. Many of the stone ships are so damaged that all that remains are parts smaller than half the original size.

Vätteryd, with about 600 menhir, has been considered one of the largest grave field in Scandinavia. Between 1955 and 1957, an archaeological survey was made of part of the burial ground. Research indicated the solitary stones constituted fire pits that were built between about the year 400 and 900 AD.  The grave goods found -including bronze jewelry, glass and bronze pearls, and bronze wire - were taken to various museums in Stockholm.

References

Archaeological sites in Sweden
Scania
Germanic archaeological sites
Iron Age Europe
Burial monuments and structures
Buildings and structures in Skåne County